Wolfgang Seidel (4 July 1926 – 1 March 1987) was a racing driver from Germany. He participated in 12 Formula One World Championship Grands Prix, debuting on 2 August 1953. He scored no championship points.

Seidel often entered cars under his own name, or under the Scuderia Colonia banner. After having been refused a start at the 1962 German Grand Prix due to slowness, Seidel got in an argument with officials from the Automobilclub von Deutschland. Combined with some doubts about the level of preparation of his cars, Seidel's competition licence was withdrawn, and he offered his two cars up for sale. In spite of not having a licence, Seidel competed in the non-championship 1962 Mexican Grand Prix a few months later.

He died in 1987 of a heart attack.

Complete Formula One World Championship results
(key)

Non-Championship results
(key) (Races in bold indicate pole position)
(Races in italics indicate fastest lap)

References

German racing drivers
German Formula One drivers
Scuderia Centro Sud Formula One drivers
Rob Walker Racing Team Formula One drivers
Ecurie Maarsbergen Formula One drivers
1926 births
1987 deaths
24 Hours of Le Mans drivers
Sportspeople from Dresden
Racing drivers from Saxony
World Sportscar Championship drivers
Formula One team owners
Porsche Motorsports drivers